The 2012 Women's Twenty20 Asia Cup was the fifth edition of the ACC Women's Asia Cup and the first edition played in the Women's Twenty20 cricket format as all four previous editions were contested in the Women's One Day International cricket format. It was organized by the Asian Cricket Council and the tournament took place at Guangzhou, China. All the matches were played at the Guanggong International Cricket Stadium, the venue for the cricket tournament in 2010 Asian Games. Eight teams competed in the tournament which was played from 24 to 31 October 2012.

Format
The teams were divided into two groups where matches were played in a round-robin format. The two best placed teams from each group progressed to the two-round knock-out stage.

Squads

Results
All times shown are in China Standard Time (UTC+08:00).

Group stage

Group A

Group B

Knockout stage

Semi-finals

Final

References

External links
 Tournament home at ESPN Cricinfo
 Tournament home at CricketArchive

International cricket competitions in 2012–13
Women's Asia Cup
Cricket ACC Women's Asia Cup
Cricket ACC Women's Asia Cup
Women's cricket in China
2012 in women's cricket
October 2012 sports events in China